A partial solar eclipse will occur on Wednesday, February 27, 2036. A solar eclipse occurs when the Moon passes between Earth and the Sun, thereby totally or partly obscuring the image of the Sun for a viewer on Earth. A partial solar eclipse occurs in the polar regions of the Earth when the center of the Moon's shadow misses the Earth.

Images 
Animated path

Related eclipses

Solar eclipses of 2033–2036

Saros 150 
It is a part of Saros cycle 150, repeating every 18 years, 11 days, containing 71 events. The series started with partial solar eclipse on August 24, 1729. It contains annular eclipses from April 22, 2126 through June 22, 2829. There are no total eclipses in this series. The series ends at member 71 as a partial eclipse on September 29, 2991. The longest duration of annularity will be 9 minutes, 58 seconds on December 19, 2522.
<noinclude>

Tritos series

Metonic cycle

References

External links 
 NASA graphics

2036 in science
2036 2 27
2036 2 27